RFA Orangeleaf (A80) was a Leaf-class support tanker of the Royal Fleet Auxiliary of the United Kingdom. She was launched on 8 February 1955 as Southern Satellite for the South Georgia Co Ltd by Furness Shipbuilding & Engineering Co Ltd of Haverton-Hill. On 25 May 1959 she was bare-boat chartered by the Admiralty and renamed Orangeleaf before being refitted by Barclay, Curle & Co Ltd. She served in the Royal Fleet Auxiliary until July 1978 when she was returned to her owners at Singapore who sold her for scrap. She arrived for scrapping at Seoul, South Korea on 14 September 1978.

References

External links

Leaf-class tankers
Tankers of the Royal Fleet Auxiliary
1955 ships
Ships built on the River Tees